Kim Min-Ji (born February 17, 1989, in Ansan) is a South Korean sport shooter. She won a silver medal for the women's skeet shooting at the 2010 Asian Games in Guangzhou, China, accumulating a score of 89 targets.

Kim represented South Korea at the 2008 Summer Olympics in Beijing, where she competed in women's skeet shooting. She placed eighteenth in the qualifying rounds of the event by six points behind Finland's Marjut Heinonen, with a total score of 55 targets.

References

External links
NBC 2008 Olympics profile

South Korean female sport shooters
Skeet shooters
Living people
Olympic shooters of South Korea
Shooters at the 2008 Summer Olympics
Asian Games medalists in shooting
People from Ansan
1989 births
Shooters at the 2010 Asian Games
Shooters at the 2014 Asian Games
Shooters at the 2018 Asian Games
Asian Games gold medalists for South Korea
Asian Games silver medalists for South Korea
Asian Games bronze medalists for South Korea
Medalists at the 2010 Asian Games
Medalists at the 2014 Asian Games
Medalists at the 2018 Asian Games
Korea National Sport University alumni
Sportspeople from Gyeonggi Province
20th-century South Korean women
21st-century South Korean women